Raúl Domínguez Romero (born 15 August 1972) is a retired male track cyclist from Cuba. He competed for his native country at the 1992 Summer Olympics in Barcelona, Spain, after having won two gold medals in the previous year at the 1991 Pan American Games in Havana, Cuba.

References

1972 births
Living people
Olympic cyclists of Cuba
Cyclists at the 1992 Summer Olympics
Cyclists at the 1991 Pan American Games
Place of birth missing (living people)
Cuban male cyclists
Pan American Games gold medalists for Cuba
Pan American Games medalists in cycling
Medalists at the 1991 Pan American Games
20th-century Cuban people
21st-century Cuban people